Marquess of Urquijo is a noble title in the peerage of Spain accompanied by the dignity of Grandee of Spain, bestoweded on Estanislao de Urquijo y Landaluce by King Amadeo I on 13 May 1871.

On 1 August 1980, the 5th Marchioness of Urquijo, María Lourdes de Urquijo and her husband, Manuel de la Sierra, were famously murdered in their Madrid home by their son in law, Rafael Escobedo. The crime, which became one of the most followed on Spanish media, is considered one of the most prominent criminal acts of post-Francoist Spain.

Marquesses of Urquijo (1871)

Estanislao de Urquijo y Landaluce, 1st Marquess of Urquijo (1817-1889)
Juan Manuel de Urquijo y Urrutia, 2nd Marquess of Urquijo (1843-1914), eldest son of the Fulgencio Urquijo y Landaluce, brother of the 1st Marquess
Estanislao de Urquijo y Ussía, 3rd Marquess of Urquijo (1872-1948), eldest son of the 2nd Marquess
Juan Manuel de Urquijo y Landecho, 4th Marquess of Urquijo (1899-1968), eldest son of the 3rd Marquess
María de Lourdes de Urquijo y Morenés, 5th Marchioness of Urquijo (1935-1980), eldest daughter of the 4th Marquess
Juan Manuel de la Sierra y Urquijo, 6th Marquess of Urquijo (1958-2022), eldest son of the 5th Marchioness

See also
List of current Grandees of Spain
Assassination of the Marquesses of Urquijo
Marquess of Bolarque

References

Lists of Spanish nobility
History of Álava
1871 establishments in Spain